Dubyago is a lunar impact crater that lies in the eastern limb of the Moon. It was named after Russian astronomers Dmitry Dubyago and Alexander Dubyago. It appears significantly foreshortened when viewed from the Earth. It lies along the southern shore of the Mare Undarum, to the southeast of the crater Firmicus.

This crater has a somewhat worn outer rim which dips down to a low point along the northern rim, and has its maximum altitude along the eastern side. The most notable aspect of this crater, however, is the dark hue of the interior floor which matches the albedo of the lunar mare to the northwest. This darker shading makes the crater stand out somewhat from its surroundings.

Dubyago has an unusual number of satellite craters, several of which have since been given names by the IAU. The most notable of these is Dubyago B, which is nearly attached to the southeastern rim of the main crater.

The name of this crater has also been spelled Dubiago in some publications.

Satellite craters
By convention these features are identified on lunar maps by placing the letter on the side of the crater midpoint that is closest to Dubyago.

The following craters have been renamed by the IAU:
 Dubyago C — See Respighi
 Dubyago P — See Pomortsev
 Dubyago Q — See Stewart
 Dubyago S — See Liouville
 Dubyago U — See Boethius

References

External links

 LTO-62C2 Dubyago — L&PI topographic map

Impact craters on the Moon